Playa del Carmen, known colloquially as 'Playa', is a resort city located along the Caribbean Sea in the state of Quintana Roo, Mexico. It is part of the municipality of Solidaridad. As of 2020, the city's population was just over 300,000 people, a small yet thriving portion of which are foreign expats.   

Playa del Carmen is a popular tourist destination in Mexico's Riviera Maya region. Its current growth rate is set at 25% per year. According to the Guinness World Records, it one of Latin America’s fastest growing communities. In 2016, the city was the tenth most popular international travel destination for U.S travelers, and over a million tourists passed through the city a year later.  The main airport for Playa is the Cancún International Airport, which is around 70 km away. This airport ranks tenth in terms of international passengers worldwide and is the second busiest in Mexico behind Mexico City.  

The area is known for its white sand beaches, blue turquoise waters, coral reefs, surrounding rainforests, and balnearios. The downtown area of the city revolves around Quinta Avenida, a busy pedestrian thoroughfare lined with many shops, clubs, and restaurants. The weather is hot year-round, with the summer and winter breaks being peak season for tourism.

Geography

Playa del Carmen is located within the Riviera Maya, which runs from south of Cancún to Tulum and the Sian Ka'an biosphere reserve. Playa is a stop for several cruise ships which dock at the nearby Calica quarry docks, about six miles (10 km) south of the city. The Xcaret Eco Park, a Mexican-themed "eco-archaeological park", is a popular tourist destination located just south of the town in Xcaret (pronounced "ish-kar-et").

Climate 

In October 2005, Hurricane Wilma passed directly over Playa del Carmen, remaining in the vicinity for two days and causing significant damage and a temporary drop in tourist arrivals. Most of the damage was relatively superficial and repaired within a few weeks of the storm. Hurricane Wilma arrived from the Caribbean Sea, passing over Cozumel before making landfall in Playa del Carmen. It then moved north along the Mexican coast, hitting Cancún especially hard.

Playa del Carmen has a tropical savannah climate (Aw) with June to November receiving most of the precipitation. Summers are hot and year round with warm nights. Cold temperatures are unheard of because of the tropical influence of the Caribbean Sea.

Demographics

Tourism 
Originally a small fishing town, tourism to Playa del Carmen began with the passenger ferry service to Cozumel, an island across the Cozumel Channel and a world-famous scuba diving destination.

Playa del Carmen has recently undergone extremely rapid development with new luxury residential condominium buildings, restaurants, boutiques, and entertainment venues. Tourist activity in Playa del Carmen centers on Quinta Avenida, or Fifth Avenue, which stretches from Calle 1 norte to Calle 40. A pedestrian walkway located just one or two blocks inland from the beach, Fifth Avenue is lined with hundreds of shops, bars, and restaurants. There are many small boutique hotels on and just off Fifth Avenue and on the beach. 

Playacar is a residential and tourist development in Playa del Carmen just south of the main urban area. Most of the all-inclusive hotels, the aviary, and the golf course are located in this development. There are two phases – phase 1 is mostly residential with a few hotels and some stores, while phase 2 contains the largest all-inclusive resorts as well as the golf course and a significant number of residential properties.

Sports 

The city is home to Inter Playa del Carmen, an association football  club founded in 1999, which competes in the south group of the Segunda División Profesional, the third tier of Mexican football league system.

The World Wide Technology Championship at Mayakoba is a PGA Tour FedEx Cup golf tournament held at El Camaleón Golf Club since 2007.  Since 2013, it has been a full-points tournament where the winner earns full rights for a PGA TOUR win.

2022 hotel shooting
On January 21, 2022, a tourist opened fire at the Xcaret all-inclusive hotel, killing two Canadians and wounding one other.

In popular culture 
The telenovela Peregrina takes place in Playa del Carmen. The Real Housewives of Vancouver featured Playa del Carmen in two episodes. The Amazing Race was shot on location in Playa del Carmen. The Celebrity Mole was set in the Playa del Carmen area. UK reality series Geordie Shore featured Playa del Carmen. It was also seen in Spies in Disguise.

Notable residents 
Notable residents include the following:
 Tory Burch Fashion designer
 David Guetta Disc jockey 
 Barry Shulman WSOP poker player
 Ana Claudia Talancón Actress
 Jeff & Lauren Lowe of Tiger King

See also 
 Cenote
 Puerto Aventuras
 Riviera Maya Jazz Festival

References

External links 

 
 

Populated places in Quintana Roo
Solidaridad (municipality)
Seaside resorts in Mexico